Nahidul Islam (born 19 July 1993) is a Bangladeshi cricketer who plays for Khulna Division. He made his Twenty20 (T20) debut on 8 November 2016 playing for Comilla Victorians in the 2016–17 Bangladesh Premier League.

In October 2018, he was named in the squad for the Rangpur Riders team, following the draft for the 2018–19 Bangladesh Premier League. In November 2019, he was selected to play for the Rajshahi Royals in the 2019–20 Bangladesh Premier League. In November 2021, in the 2021–22 National Cricket League, he scored his maiden century in first-class cricket.

See also
 List of Khulna Division cricketers

References

External links
 

1993 births
Living people
Bangladeshi cricketers
Khulna Division cricketers
Comilla Victorians cricketers
Rangpur Riders cricketers
People from Khulna